Milovan Jović (Serbian Cyrillic: Милован Јовић; 5 February 1955 – 8 June 2009) was a Serbian footballer most notably with FK Partizan.

He died on 8 June 2009.

Honours
Partizan
 Yugoslav First League: 1977–78

References

External links
Profile at Crno-bela nostalgija
Obituary at B92

1955 births
2009 deaths
Yugoslav footballers
Serbian footballers
Serbian expatriate footballers
Yugoslav First League players
Segunda División players
FK Partizan players
FK Rad players
OFK Beograd players
Elche CF players
Expatriate footballers in Spain
Footballers from Belgrade
Association football forwards